Isodontia exornata is a species of thread-waisted wasp in the family Sphecidae.

References

Further reading

 

Sphecidae
Insects described in 1903